Guus Berend Til (born 22 December 1997) is a Dutch professional footballer who plays as an attacking midfielder for Eredivisie club PSV and the Netherlands national team.

Early life
Til was born in Samfya, Zambia, where his father worked in the development field. He moved to the Netherlands at age 3, as his family settled in the Bijlmermeer in Amsterdam.

Club career

AZ
Til is a youth exponent from AZ. He made his professional debut on 4 August 2016 as a substitute in a UEFA Europa League play-off match against PAS Giannina, replacing Joris van Overeem after 71 minutes.

Spartak Moscow
On 5 August 2019, Spartak Moscow announced they had signed Guus Til from AZ for a reported transfer fee of €18 million (the third highest transfer fee in club history at the time). He also signed a 4 year contract with the club.  In his Russian Premier League debut on 11 August 2019 against FC Akhmat Grozny, he provided 2 assists in a 3–1 victory. He scored his first goal for Spartak on 25 August 2019 in an away game against PFC Krylia Sovetov Samara, when his added-time goal gave his team a 2–1 comeback away victory.

Loan to SC Freiburg
On 3 September 2020, Til joined Bundesliga side SC Freiburg on a season-long loan with option to buy.

Loan to Feyenoord
On 2 June 2021, Til extended his contract with Spartak until 31 May 2024 and was loaned to Feyenoord for the 2021–22 season. Spartak held an option to terminate his loan early if he appeared in fewer than half of all official games for Feyenoord up until 1 January 2022.

On 29 July 2021, Til scored a hat-trick against FC Drita of Kosovo in the second qualifying round for the inaugural edition of the UEFA Europa Conference League.

On 3 October, Til was named the Eredivisie Player of the Month for September following four goals in three league matches for Feyenoord, which all ended in victory for the Rotterdam club.

PSV Eindhoven
On 4 July 2022, Til signed a four-year contract with PSV. Til scored a hat-trick on his debut for the club, a 5–3 win over rivals Ajax in the Johan Cruyff Shield on 30 July.

International career
Til was a youth international for the Netherlands.

In March 2018, Til earned from Ronald Koeman his debut international call-up to the Netherlands national team. He made his debut coming on as a substitute for Kenny Tete in the 78th minute of a 3–0 friendly win against Portugal on 26 March 2018.

In May 2021, the Football Association of Zambia had confirmed they had contacted Til over a possible switch of international allegiance. Zambia head coach Milutin Sredojević stated that Til was still undecided on his future. Til returned to the Netherlands national team in September 2021 scoring his first goal in a 6–1 win over Turkey.

Career statistics

Club

International

Scores and results list the Netherlands's goal tally first, score column indicates score after each Til goal.

Honours
Feyenoord
 UEFA Europa Conference League runner-up: 2021–22

PSV
 Johan Cruyff Shield: 2022

Individual
Eredivisie Player of the Month: September 2021
Eredivisie Team of the Month: September 2021

References

External links

 Profile at the PSV Eindhoven website
 
 U21 profile at Ons Oranje
 U20 profile at Ons Oranje
 Profile at Voetbal International

1997 births
Living people
People from Samfya District
Footballers from Amsterdam
Association football midfielders
Dutch footballers
Netherlands youth international footballers
Netherlands international footballers
Zambian footballers
Zambian people of Dutch descent
AZ Alkmaar players
Jong AZ players
FC Spartak Moscow players
SC Freiburg players
Feyenoord players
PSV Eindhoven players
Eredivisie players
Eerste Divisie players
Russian Premier League players
Bundesliga players
Dutch expatriate footballers
Expatriate footballers in Russia
Expatriate footballers in Germany
Dutch expatriate sportspeople in Russia
Dutch expatriate sportspeople in Germany